Rod Connop (born June 4, 1959, in North Vancouver, British Columbia) is a former professional Canadian football player for the Edmonton Eskimos of the Canadian Football League. Connop spent his entire 16-year career with the Eskimos as an offensive lineman.  Connop played CIS football at Wilfrid Laurier Golden Hawks. He was named CFL All-Star six times and won the CFL's Most Outstanding Offensive Lineman Award in the 1989 CFL season. Connop played 210 consecutive games with the Eskimos from 1983 until his retirement following the 1997 season. As of 2011, he continued to be the all-time Eskimo leader in games played (274). He is a member of the Canadian Football Hall of Fame, where he was inducted in 2005. His son Rory Connop played for the Saskatchewan Roughriders of the CFL as a defensive lineman.

References

1959 births
Living people
Canadian Football Hall of Fame inductees
Canadian football offensive linemen
Edmonton Elks players
Players of Canadian football from British Columbia
Wilfrid Laurier Golden Hawks football players